Rachel Rose (born 1986) is an American visual artist known for her video installations. Her work explores how our changing relationship to landscape has shaped storytelling and belief systems. She draws from, and contributes to, a long history of cinematic innovation, and through her subjects—whether investigating cryogenics, 17th century agrarian England, the American Revolutionary War, modernist architecture, or the sensory experience of walking in outer space—she questions what it is that makes us human and the ways we seek to alter and escape that designation.

Recent solo exhibitions include Pond Society (2020); Lafayette Anticipations (2020); Fridericianum (2019); LUMA Foundation (2019); Fondazione Sandretto (2018); Philadelphia Museum of Art (2018); Kunsthaus Bregenz (2017); Museu Serralves (2016); The Aspen Art Museum (2016); The Whitney Museum of American Art (2016) and Serpentine Galleries (2015). In addition to these and other solo exhibitions, the artist's work has been featured in the 2018 Carnegie International, the 2017 Venice Biennale, the 2016 São Paulo Biennial, and numerous other group exhibitions.

Among her recent projects are Enclosure (2019), jointly commissioned by the Park Avenue Armory in New York and LUMA Foundation in Arles, Wil-o-Wisp (2018), jointly commissioned and owned by the Philadelphia Museum of Art and Fondazione Sandretto Re Rebaudengo; Everything and More (2015), presented at the Whitney Museum of American Art, New York; and Palisades (2015), at the Serpentine Galleries in London in 2014. Rose is the recipient of the 2015 Frieze Artist Award.

Early life and education
Rose is the daughter of Diana (née Calthorpe) and Jonathan F. P. Rose. Her father is an urban planner with a focus on sustainable housing, Her uncle is the architect Peter Calthorpe. She started her education by earning a B.A. in humanities and B.A. art from Yale University and a M.F.A. from Columbia University. She entered graduate school as a painter, and quickly shifted, she studied under Rirkrit Tiravanija.

Work
Rose produces video installations juxtaposing images and sounds.  Her experiential pieces work to convey sensorial aspects of ideas by manipulating sound and image. Her imagery depicts "humanity's shard current anxieties and their multi-layered interconnectivity" as well as humanities' relationship to the natural world, advancing technology, mortality, and history.

Sitting Feeding Sleeping (2013), which she filmed at a cryogenics lab in Arizona zoological parks, and a robotics perception lab, debuted at the Taipei Biennial. In this work, Rose combined footage taken of zoo animals living in captivity with screen images that flicker and flash before us. In the narration, Rose talks about forms of life that are suspended and simulated—artificial intelligence and cryogenically frozen bodies, zoo animals and counterfeit ecologies. Through this montage of different types of footage and text, Rose poses us between the natural and the artificial, and speaks to the very strange moment of life in a world that is seemingly caught between the two, existing in a hybrid (though not necessarily symbiotic) moment of radical change.

In Palisades in Palisades (2014), Rose uses a remote control lens and a precise trompe-l’œil editing technique to link a girl, standing on the banks of the Hudson River at the Palisades Interstate Park in New York, to different moments in the landscape’s history, including the memory of the site’s involvement in the American Revolutionary War. Through the juxtaposition of seemingly unrelated events, Rose’s work presents humanity’s shared current anxieties and their multi-layered interconnectivity: our changing relationship to the natural world, the advance of technology, catastrophes, our own mortality and the impact of history.

A Minute Ago (2014) starts with a hailstorm pelting down unexpectedly on a quiet beach in Siberia. People, half naked, run for cover under towels and parasols, to the music of the Pink Floyd. The next scene is an interview of Philip Johnson, filmed 10 years before in the Glass House he constructed. Johnson was 90 years old then. At this point in the video there is a kind of digital sound that interrupts the high definition image, moving to the rhythm of a wood percussion musical composition. The house, surrounded by an extraordinary landscape, is then bombarded by hail, the soundtrack becomes a live concert interrupted by the yelling and cheering of the public. The painting Landscape with the funeral of Phocion by Poussin is the only image in the house. It shows a hearse going through fields to the burial place. The image duplicates itself with the deconstruction of the video image, the rain which pixelates the screen, the soundtrack which chops up this time space.

In October 2015, Rose presented Everything and More, a solo show at the Whitney Museum of American Art. Everything and More (2015) was inspired by David Wolf's experience of a space walk. The film’s overall effect is to transport viewers into the void, even during snippets of an electronic dance music show. To capture the feeling of weightless described by Wolf, Rose filmed at the University of Maryland’s Neutral Buoyancy Laboratory, plunging a camera into the lab’s watery depths. She achieved the film’s abstract, vaguely extraterrestrial shots by using an air compressor on liquids such as milk, oil, water, and ink. Rose projected the video on a semi-transparent screen and covered the windows of the gallery's black box with opaque scrim to achieve an out-of-body feel. Instead of blacking out the room's floor-to-ceiling windows, Rose has covered them with a translucent scrim, dimming but not fully obscuring the view of the rooftop behind it, full of sculptures from the current Frank Stella retrospective. Whitney curator Christopher Y. Lew noted "how she was able to gather such a mix of images, and of content as well, and weave it into a unique narrative. She pulled some kind of order out of our whirlpool of information, without ever denying the flood."

Lake Valley (2016) was first exhibited at Pilar Corrias in 2016, and was later presented at the 2017 Venice Biennale and the Carnegie International, 57th Edition, 2018. Concerned with the topic of childhood, Lake Valley is an animation composed of meticulously hand-drawn celluloid frames and layered plates generated from thousands of scanned 18th-20th century children’s book illustrations. Set in an imagined American suburb that shares the title of the work, Lake Valley centers on a domesticated chimeric animal left alone by its owners. The impulse for Lake Valley was Rose’s inquiry into Western ideas of childhood as separate from adulthood. Industrialization gave rise to the nuclear family, delineating the child’s role as separate from that of the adult. Modern children’s literature evolved out of this in the 18th century during the Industrial Revolution in Europe. Recognizing the themes of abandonment and separation as a dominant narrative in early children’s stories, Rose wrote a fable that amalgamated literary sources she was researching from the past, to create her own retelling of loneliness.

Wil-o-Wisp (2018), co-commissioned by the Philadelphia Museum of Art and the Fondazione Sandretto Re Rebaudengo, follows Elspeth Blake, a mystic and healer, living in rural Somerset in the 1500s. The film explores how the practice of magic and coincidence influence the fate of a woman named Elspeth Blake. Rose frames her story against the backdrop of England’s Enclosure Movement, which privatized communal land and spurred violent upheavals in agrarian life. Rose models the chapters of Elspeth’s life after accounts of healers persecuted for their practices, which were considered deviant and threatening within increasingly regulated society. Weaving together the harsh realities of the rural English landscape with ghostly sprites and the ethereal forces of magic, Rose questions how our perceptions of the world, and of others, can so radically change within the fluctuating norms of society and the seismic shifts of history.

Enclosure (2019), co-commissioned by the LUMA Foundation and Park Avenue Armory, was first shown at the LUMA Foundation in 2019. The film follows the Famlee, a cult-like clan of grifters led by Jaccko, a hustler who in the wake of the Enclosure Laws, persuades the rural inhabitants to sell him their land for almost nothing, for his own mercenary purposes. Recent, the key teenage member of The Famlee, is essential to Jaccko as she is tasked with learning the behaviors and livelihoods of their targets, and then closing the deal. It is on the journey to their last predation that the story begins. Set beneath a mysterious black orb whose inky aura and other-worldly presence hints at a major cosmic event, the film shows how the natural world was perceived at the time and alludes to the scale of the dire changes soon to come.

Art market 
Rose is represented by Pilar Corrias, London and Gladstone Gallery in New York. She previously worked with Gavin Brown's Enterprise in New York and Rome.

Exhibitions

Solo exhibitions

A Minute Ago, High Art, Paris, France (2014)
Palisades at the Serpentine Galleries London, UK (2015)
Everything and More at The Whitney Museum of American Art New York, NY (2015)
Interiors at Castello di Rivoli Turin, Italy (2015)
Lake Valley at Pilar Corrias, London, UK (2016)
Rachel Rose at Aspen Art Museum Aspen, CO (2016)
Rachel Rose, Museu Serralves, Porto, Portugal (2016) 
Lake Valley, Gavin Brown's enterprise, New York, NY (2017)
Rachel Rose, Kunsthaus Bregenz, Bregenz, Austria (2017)
Rachel Rose: Wil-o-Wisp/The Future Fields Commission at Philadelphia Museum of Art (2018)
Rachel Rose: Wil-o-Wisp/The Future Fields Commission at Fondazione Sandretto Re Rebaudengo, Turin, Italy (2018)
Wil-O-Wisp, Pilar Corrias, London, UK (2019) 
Enclosure, LUMA Foundation, Arles, France (2019) 
Rachel Rose, Fridericianum, Kassel, Germany (2019) 
Rachel Rose, Lafayette Anticipations, Paris, France (2020) 
Rachel Rose, Pond Society, Shanghai, China (2020) 
Enclosure, Gladstone Gallery, New York, NY (2022)
Enclosure, Pilar Corrias, London, UK (2022)

Group exhibitions

A Programming Language, Primary Work Surface, London, UK (2012) 
Shelf Life, Primary Work Surface, London, UK  (2012)
xoxo, Night Gallery, Los Angeles, CA (2013)
Sonic Hedgehog, Malraux's Place, New York, NY (2013)
Visual Arts Columbia University Thesis Show, Fisher Landau Center for Art, New York, NY (2013)
Uncanny Valleys, Electronic Arts Intermix, New York, NY (2013)
Geographies of Contamination, David Roberts Art Foundation, London (2013)
Chance Motives, Sculpture Center, New York, NY (2013)
The Great Acceleration, Taipei Biennial, Taipei (2014)
Phantom Limbs, Pilar Corrias Gallery, London, UK (2014) 
The Elephant Test, Lothringer 13, Munich, Germany (2014) 
 Welt am Draht at Julia Stoschek Collection, Berlin
Co-workers at the Musee D'Art Moderne Paris, France (2015)
Visitors, Governor's Island, New York, NY (2015)
Works on Paper, Greene Naftali, New York, NY (2015) 
Cloud Cover, CCS Hessel Museum of Contemporary Art, Annandale-on-Hudson, New York (2015)
The Importance of Being a (Moving) Image, National Gallery, Prague, Czechia (2015)
This a Way, White Flag Projects, Saint Louis, MO (2015) 
The Infinite Mix at Hayward Gallery (2016)
Take Me (I’m Yours), The Jewish Museum, New York, NY (2016)
Incerteza viva [Live Uncertainty], 32nd Bienal de Sao Paulo, São Paulo, Brazil (2016) 
Frozen World of the Familiar Stranger, Khoj, New Delhi, India (2016) 
Frozen World of the Familiar Stranger, Kadist, San Francisco, CA (2016) 
Invisible Adversaries, Marieluise Hessel Collection, The Hessel Museum of Art Center for Curatorial Studies, Bard College, Annandale-on-Hudson, NY (2016)
Okayama Art Summit in Japan (2016)
Life Itself at Moderna Museet Stockholm, Sweden (2016)
Biennale, Venice, Italy (2017) 
Truth: 24 frames per second, Dallas Museum of Art, Dallas, TX  (2017)
The Forecast, Croy Nielsen, Vienna, Austria (2017)
In relation to a Spectator, Kestner Gesellschaft, Hanover, Germany (2017)
Group Exhibition, SESC Palmas, Segurado, Palmas, Brazil (2017)
Generation Loss: 10 Years, Julia Stoschek Collection, Düsseldorf, Germany (2017)
Tomorrow Will Still Be Ours, A Festival of Visionary Ideas, Activism & Arts
GBE & The Tate Group, Gavin Brown's enterprise, New York, NY (2017)
Enfance at Palais de Tokyo, Paris, France (2018)
 Carnegie International, Carnegie Museum of Art Pittsburgh, PA  (2018)
 One Day at a Time: Manny Farber and Termite Art, Museum of Contemporary Art,  Los Angeles, CA (2018)
 THE MOON, The Louisiana Museum of Modern Art, Humlebæk, Denmark  (2018)
 GIVE UP THE GHOST, Baltic Triennale XIII, Vilnius, Lithuania  (2018) 
 A Minute Ago, Zabludowicz Collection, London, UK (2018) 
Time Kills – Time-based art from the Julia Stoschek Collection, Sesc Avenida Paulista, São Paulo, Brazil (2019) 
The Moon – From Inner Worlds to Outer Space, Henie Onstad Kunstsenter, Høvikodden, Norway (2019) 
Intimate Distance, Hotel des Collections, MoCo Panacée, Montpellier, France (2019)
Moon Shot, Moody Center for the Arts, Rice University, Houston, TX (2019) 
You, Musée d'Art Moderne, Paris, France (2019) 
Age of You, MOCA Toronto, Canada (2019) 
Structures of Feeling, Galerie Maria Bernheim, Zurich, Switzerland (2020) 
Rachel Rose: Lake Valley, El Paso Museum of Art, El Paso, TX (2020) 
ONLINE: Rachel Rose: Lake Valley, Carnegie Museum of Art, Pittsburgh, PA (2020) 
ONLINE: Do It. Around The World, Serpentine Gallery, London, UK (2020) 
Toward the Texture of Knowing, Haggerty Museum, Minneapolis, MN (2020) 
Muses, Yu Gong (Foolish Men) and Compasses, Pingshan Art Museum, Shenzhen, China (2020)
2020+, Red Brick Museum, Beijing, China (2020)
Valentino Re-Signify Part One Shanghai, Power Station of Art, Shanghai, China (2020)
The Henry at Drive-in at On the Boards Parking Lot, Henry Art Gallery, Seattle, WA (2020) 
Lake Valley, Denison Museum, Ohio (2021)  
…barely pausing/pausing barely…, A Tale of A Tub, Tlön Projects, Rotterdam, Netherlands (2021) 
Host Modded, Art Sonje Center, Seoul, South Korea (2021) 
the pleasurable, the illegible, the multiple, the mundane, Artspace, Sydney, Australia (2021) 
Supernatural America: The Paranormal in American Art, Speed Museum of Art, Louisville, KY (2021) 
Supernatural America: The Paranormal in American Art, Toledo Museum of Art, Toledo, OH (2021) 
SUN RISE  SUN SET, Schinkel Pavilion, Berlin, Germany (2021) 
Supernatural America: The Paranormal in American Art, Minneapolis Institute of Art, Minneapolis, MN (2021)
Age of You, Jameel Arts Centre, Jaddaf Waterfront, Dubai, UAE (2021)

Awards
Rose won the illy Present Future Prize at Artissima 2014 and the Frieze Artist Award for site-specific installations by emerging artists at the London fair.

References

External links
Serpentine Galleries: "Rachel Rose talks about her exhibition, Palisades, at the Serpentine Sackler Gallery from 1 October to 8 November" October 6, 2015
Contemporary Art Daily: "Rachel Rose at High Art" October 6, 2014"

American video artists
American women installation artists
American installation artists
Jewish American artists
1986 births
Rose family
Living people
Yale University alumni
Columbia University School of the Arts alumni
21st-century American women artists
21st-century American Jews